was an American inventor and politician who served as the mayor of Edmonston, Maryland in 1927 and 1943.

Biography 
Matsudaira was born in Pennsylvania on September 13, 1885, as the son of a Japanese father, Tadaatsu, and an American mother, Carrie Sampson.  He was a descendant of the Fujii-Matsudaira clan.  After his father's death, he lived with his maternal grandparents in Virginia.  On May 1, 1912, Matsudaira filed for U.S. Patent 1,111,912 concerning the functions of a thermometric fire-detector.  The patent was granted to him on September 29, 1914.

In 1925, Matsudaira sent a letter to the Embassy of Japan in Washington, D.C., asking whether he was related to Tsuneo Matsudaira, the Japanese Ambassador to the United States at the time.  

Matsudaira was elected as the mayor of Edmonston, Maryland, in the summer of 1927. The election reportedly made him the first Japanese American mayor in the United States.  He was re-elected as mayor of Edmonston in 1943.

References

External links 
 

1885 births
1963 deaths
20th-century American politicians
American inventors
American mayors of Japanese descent
American politicians of Japanese descent
Asian-American people in Maryland politics
Fujii-Matsudaira clan